Ibrahim Bahar (August 2, 1956—February 15, 2019) was a Bahraini actor.

Biography
Bahar is the older brother of Bahraini singer Ali Bahar. A leading actor and director on the Bahraini theatre scene, he graduated from the Higher Institute of Dramatic Arts in 1982 and earned a postgraduate degree at Saint Joseph University in Beirut. He married and had four daughters and a son. He was the Director of Radio and Television Production for a time at the Center for Educational Technologies, part of the Ministry of Education. Bahar featured and sometimes directed many plays and television series in Bahrain and around the Gulf states.

Death
Bahar died on Friday, February 15, 2019, after a struggle with kidney disease. Several prominent actors mourned him on social media.

External links
 El Cinema page

References

1956 births
2019 deaths
Bahraini male actors
Saint Joseph University alumni